Cuadrilla de Vitoria    is a comarca of the province of Álava, Spain. It contains 65 localities.

Comarcas of Álava